Arab American University (AAUP) is the first private university in Palestine. AAUP was founded in the year 2000 and it provides BA, MA and PhD degree programs. The main campus is located near Talfit at the south of Jenin Governorate, and the other campuses are located, in the Al- Reehan area in Ramallah and al-Bireh Governorate of the State of Palestine.

AAUP has also gained membership in the Association of Arab Universities, the Federation of Islamic Universities, and the Association of Private Universities.

History 
The idea of the Arab American University started in 1996 in a discussion between some Palestinian businessmen. Among them was Dr. Yousef Asfour who is currently the Head of the Board of Directors of the university.

Jenin governorate was chosen to be the place for the main campus of AAUP since the northern part of the West Bank was missing a higher educational institution and especially because Jenin is located near the Arab cities and villages of the green line territories. And so, Arab American University was opened on September 28, 2000 with a capital of $12 million USD, with few students and one building that contained four faculties: the Faculty of Dentistry, the Faculty of Sciences, the Faculty of Allied Medical Sciences, and the Faculty of Administrative and Financial Sciences.

The academic programmes in AAUP started under collaboration with California State University (CSU) in Stanislaus, which helped with the curriculum, and Utah State University (USU) in Logan, which provided faculty members and staff during the first years. In 2017, AAUP opened the second campus in Ramallah and AlBireh governorate. And currently, AAUP provides over 40 programmes in BA, high diploma, MA, and PhD degrees.

Goals 
AAUP has many goals including:

 (Academic Excellence): AAUP adopted a developed management and quality control system to determine the fields that need to be focused on in order to improve the faculty members performance, improve English language for both faculty members and students to reach proficiency in it, expand in using information technology in teaching and learning, establish a capacity building unit, establish a monitoring and directing system to monitor students, and the continuous follow up for graduates through the alumni club.  
 (Scientific Research): AAUP encourages the scientific research field and encourages students to participate in it, focuses on the internal support for research projects to encourage the scientific research culture, enhances the collaboration relations with the national, regional and international universities, searches for external fund resources, works on expanding the graduate studies programs, activates the scientific sabbatical leaves for faculty staff, works on keeping the teaching burden according to international standards, provides financial incentives for researchers who gained an external fund, encourages participation in international conferences and supports faculty members’ mobility between local universities.
 (Sustainability and Financial Independence): AAUP implements a real budget system. The surplus is used to bring in efficient faculty members and to start developmental and infrastructure projects. In order to achieve its sustainability and financial independence, AAUP seeks to increase number of students by expanding horizontally by (increasing the number of new programs), and vertically by its (graduate studies programs), to establish new centers aiming to increase income, such as: Consultants centers, specialized clinics, entertainment facilities, AAUP hospital and dormitories.
 (Local Community): AAUP cares to build partnership relations with civil society institutions through providing continuous education and training, and through collaborating with the industrial and commercial sectors. AAUP seeks to enhance relations with the community through the office of the Vice President for Community Affairs and the Public and International Relations Department, to determine the cooperation aspects and the possible ways to expand and improve its services to the community.  AAUP also works on restructuring and developing activities that require community services, on improving the consultant centers and also works on encouraging the establishing of Arab American University Friends Association.

Educational environment 
AAUP provides an educational environment including the educational and technological means and facilities such as the buildings, the computer laboratories, the medical devices and the sports village and it always encourages its students to learn and train themselves for the best to be able to compete locally, regionally and internationally in accordance to the main vision of AAUP.

Academic faculties

Faculty of Administrative and Financial Sciences 

The Faculty of Administrative and Financial Sciences provides the following BA programs: Accounting, Business Administration, Human Resources Management, Financial and Banking Sciences, Marketing, Hospitals and Health Care Management, Management Information System (MIS), Finance and Data Science and Economics and Islamic Banking.

Faculty of Allied Medical Sciences 

The Faculty of Allied Medical Sciences offers BA programs related to the medical professionals and medical technology such as: Prosthetics and Orthotics, Physiotherapy, Occupational Therapy, Medical Laboratory Sciences, Environmental Sciences and Technology, Medical Imaging, Pharmacy and Speech, Language, and Hearing Disorders.

Faculty of Arts 

The Faculty of Arts offers BA degree programs in many academic fields such as: Arabic Language and Media, Basic Elementary Education and English Language. The faculty also offers some diploma degrees in education like: Diploma in Education for Upper Basic Level – Teaching English, Diploma in Education for Upper Basic Level – Teaching Mathematics and Diploma in Education for Upper Basic Level – Teaching Arabic.

Faculty of Dentistry 

The Faculty of Dentistry offers an academic program enables students to get a BA in Dental Surgery to be a Dental Surgery Doctor. The faculty also offers a Diploma in Dental Technology.

Faculty of Engineering and Information Technology 

The first cohort of the Faculty of Engineering and Information Technology graduated in 2003/2004, and this faculty offers the following programs: Electrical Engineering and Renewable Energy, Computer Systems Engineering, Geographic Information System, Multimedia Technology, Computer Science, Computer Science / Minor Information Technology, Computer Networks / Minor Information Security / Biomedical Engineering and Telecommunications Engineering.

Faculty of Law 

The Faculty of Law was established in AAUP in the beginning of the academic year 2002/2003 and it offers the following programs: Fiqh and Law and Law.

Faculty of Medicine 
The Faculty of Medicine was established in 2020, and it offers BA in Medicine program.

Faculty of Modern Sciences 

This faculty was established recently aiming to keep up with the recent global developments and to provide programs that are compatible to the market needs such as: Digital Marketing, Interior Architecture and Optometry.

Faculty of Modern Media 

The Faculty of Modern Media offers some contemporary BA programs such as: Digital Media, Communication and Social Media and Public Relations.

Faculty of Nursing 

The Nursing Department was established in 2006 and it offers a BA in Nursing. In 2016, the department was separated from the Faculty of Allied Medical Sciences and was an independent Faculty of Nursing.

Faculty of Sciences 

The faculty of sciences offers programs that enable students to get their BA degree in many academic specializations. Also the faculty offers some of the basic science elective and obligatory courses for students from other faculties.

The Faculty of Sciences offers the following BA programs: Biology and Biotechnology, Biology and Biotechnology / minor in Education, Chemistry, Chemistry / minor in Education, Mathematics and Statistics, Mathematics and Statistics / minor in Computer Science, Mathematics and Statistics / minor in Education, Physics, Physics / minor in Computer Science, Physics / minor in Education.

Faculty of Sport Sciences 

AAUP has many sports buildings and facilities that provide sport services to student, such as a half-Olympic swimming pool, an international football stadium recognized and accredited by the Asian Football Confederation, sports halls, a gym and some inside and outside courts and fields such as a basketball field, a volleyball field, a tennis field, handball field, five-a-side soccer field, squash field, percussion hall and table tennis hall. The faculty offers a BA degree in sport sciences.

Faculty of Graduate Studies 

AAUP provides MA, PhD and High Diploma graduate programs degrees in:

 Residency Program in Orthodontics, Advanced Residency in Prosthodontics, High Diploma in Oral Implantology, High Diploma in Esthetic Dentistry and High Diploma in Endodontics.
 Master in Business Administration, Master in Human Resource Management, Master in Quality Management, Master in Intercultural Communication and Literature, Master in Strategic Planning and Fundraising, Master in Applied Mathematics, Master in Contemporary Public Relations, Master in Physics, Master in Commercial Law, Master in Master in International Law and Diplomacy, Master in Civil Law, Master in Health Informatics, Master in Molecular Genetics and Genetic Toxicolog, Master in Emergency Nursing, Master in Ophthalmic Nursing, Master in Conflict Resolution, Master in Data Science and Business Analytics, Master in Cybercrimes and Digital Evidence Analysis, Master in Computer Science, Master in Educational Psychology, Master in Innovation in Education, Master in Leadership, Master in Accounting and Auditing, Clinical Master in Periodontology and Implant Dentistry, Master in Intensive Care Nursing, Master in Molecular Virology and Master in Criminal Science.
 PhD in Business, PhD in Educational Administration, PhD in Physics, PhD in Information Technology Engineering, PhD in Educational Psychology, PhD in Special Education and PhD in Nursing.

Scientific research 
The Journal of Arab American University

It is a biannual international refereed scientific journal issued by the Deanship of Scientific Research at the Arab American University since 2014 in both English and Arabic. In 2018, the journal got the first place in the Arab Impact Factor (AIF) of 3.07 and it accepts research papers in different fields of humanities and natural sciences.

Digital Repository

The Digital Repository in AAUP enhances the openness in culture to all communities and eases the access to all information and digital data for all beneficiaries from inside the university or the local community or the world, and this in turn serves the education process directly. The digital repository provides papers, technical reports, conference papers, scientific articles, books, studies, dissertations, scientific papers and researches, projects and data collections.

Research Awards

AAUP Excellence Award for Scientific Research

This award was first awarded in the academic year 2016 / 2017 aiming to encourage researchers in the Palestinian universities to conduct scientific researches.

This award has an amount of US$12.000 and it is granted to the winners of the best scientific researches in one of the following fields: Natural Sciences, Engineering and Technology, Medical and Health Sciences or Social and Humanitarian Sciences.   

Best Published Research Award in the Arab American University Research Journal

It is an annual award of an amount of US$15.000 granted to the best published research in Arab American University Journal.

Engineer Zuhair Hijjawi Award

This annual award with an amount of US$10.000 targets undergraduate creative students and is granted for the best scientific research in one of the following fields: Information Technology, Engineering, Environment, Water and Renewable Energy Sciences and the Basic Sciences.

AAUP centers 
AAUP has many centers such as: The Center of Excellence for Climate Change and Environmental Technologies, the Dental Center in Main Campus, the Hydrotherapy and Physiotherapy Center, the Pediatric Rehabilitation Center, the Heart Center, the Simulation Laboratory, the Medical Center in Ramallah Campus, the Policy and Conflict Resolution Studies Center, the Language Center, the Continuing Education Center and Hassib Sabbagh Information Technology Center of Excellence.

Sports buildings and facilities 
The Half-Olympics Swimming Pool

AAUP finished the establishing of the half-Olympics swimming pool that will be part of the courses of the Faculty of Sport Sciences and will provide services to employees and the local community.

AAUP International Stadium 

It was established according to international FIFA standards, and is considered to be the Palestinian home court for the Palestinian soccer team. It was used in many international soccer games.

A Multi-Function Sport Hall

It is a multi-function sport hall that meets international standards and specifications of lightening ventilation, sound insulation and air conditioning...etc. Nationally, it is the largest hall and can accommodate over 5000 persons. It has a Five-a-side soccer field, Handball field, Volleyball field, Table Tennis hall, Badminton field, Basketball field, in addition to a Judo hall, a gym hall, a fitness hall and a squash hall.

Outside Sport Fields

The outside sport fields have fields for sports such as: a Five-a-side soccer, Basketball, Handball, Volleyball, Tennis and Badminton and has a stadium for over 2500 person according to international standards.

AAUP radio 
It was established in 2018, and discusses the local community cases and issues.

AAUP presidents 
The presidents of Arab American University are:

 Waleed Deeb (1/9/2000 – 31/3/2005).
 Munther Salah (1/4/2005 – 31/3/2007).
 Adli Saleh (1/4/2007 – 31/8/2012).
 Mahmoud Abu Mwais (11/9/2012 – 31/8/2015).
 Ali Zedan Abu Zuhri (2015 – )

See also 

 List of universities and colleges in the State of Palestine
 Education in the State of Palestine

References

External links 
 AAUP Website

Content in this edit is from the existing Arabic Wikipedia article at :ar:الجامعة العربية الأمريكية (فلسطين); see its history for attribution. Formatting follows.

Educational institutions established in 1995
Buildings and structures in Jenin
Ramallah
Universities and colleges in the State of Palestine
1995 establishments in the Palestinian territories
Arab American University
Nursing schools in the State of Palestine